La Sportiva is a footwear brand founded in 1928 by Narciso Delladio in Italy.  He started his business by manufacturing boots and clogs for farmers and lumberjacks.  In World War II, he helped to provide Italy's soldiers with custom mountaineering boots. In the 1950s, he began to make ski boots and first introduced the brand name of La Sportiva.

Today, La Sportiva is a popular brand of footwear for mountaineering, climbing and skiing. Its products are widely available in Europe and North America.

It sponsors athletes across a number of sports including mountain running, rock climbing, ice climbing, alpine climbing and skiing. Among those athletes, Tommy Caldwell has received national attention with his partner Kevin Jorgeson when they made the first free ascent of the Dawn Wall in Yosemite, California. La Sportiva had previously collaborated with Caldwell in the development of the TC Pro climbing shoe. This was the shoe that Caldwell used while making his ascent of the Dawn Wall and by Alex Honnold for the Free Solo of El Capitan.

Products 
La Sportiva is known for its footwear designed for outdoor sports like climbing, running, hiking, and skiing. The company's product line includes specialized equipment for a variety of terrain, including technical rock faces.

References

External links
 Official homepage
 Website for La Sportiva North America
 Website for La Sportiva Russia

Italian companies established in 1928
Climbing and mountaineering equipment companies
Clothing companies established in 1928
Shoe companies of Italy
Shoe brands
Outdoor clothing brands
Sporting goods manufacturers of Italy